Henry Hardy Heins ( - ) was an American Lutheran minister, historian and bibliographer. He was born in Hollis, Queens on Long Island and received degrees from Hartwick College and Gettysburg Theological Seminary. He was ordained a Lutheran minister in 1948 and served at parishes in the upstate New York towns of Central Bridge, Liberty and Albany. Heins wrote books on history and a bibliography of Edgar Rice Burroughs, after collecting and studying his works for over 30 years.

Works
 Throughout All the Years (1946)
 Numeral Cancellations of the British Empire (1959)
 A Golden Anniversary Bibliography of Edgar Rice Burroughs (1964)
 Swan of Albany (1976)

References

Bibliography

External links
 

1923 births
2003 deaths
20th-century American Lutheran clergy
20th-century American historians
American male non-fiction writers
American bibliographers
People from Hollis, Queens
Historians from New York (state)
20th-century American male writers
Hartwick College alumni